Josephine Russell (born 9 November 1994) is a British female acrobatic gymnast. With partners Jennifer Bailey and Cicely Irwin, Russell competed in the 2014 Acrobatic Gymnastics World Championships.

References

1994 births
Living people
British acrobatic gymnasts
Female acrobatic gymnasts
21st-century British women